Edgar Holland Winter (born December 28, 1946) is an American musician. He is a multi-instrumentalist, playing keyboards, guitar, saxophone, and percussion, as well as singing. His success peaked in the 1970s with his band the Edgar Winter Group and their popular songs "Frankenstein" and "Free Ride". He is the brother of late blues singer and guitarist Johnny Winter.

Early life
Winter was born to John Winter II and Edwina Winter on December 28, 1946, in Beaumont, Texas. Both he and his older brother Johnny were born with albinism. By the time he left the family home, Winter had already mastered numerous instruments and reading and writing music.

Career

Winter composed and performed songs of numerous genres, including rock, jazz, blues, and pop. His critically acclaimed 1970 debut release, Entrance, was first to demonstrate his unique style of non-sequitir, genre-blending musicianship. His early recording of "Tobacco Road" propelled him into the national spotlight. Edgar followed Entrance with two hit albums backed by his group White Trash, a group originally composed of musicians from Texas and Louisiana. White Trash, with Winter and Jerry Lacroix both on lead vocals and sax, released the studio album Edgar Winter's White Trash, in 1971. It reached #111 on the charts, and 1972's follow-up album (partially recorded at New York's Apollo Theater) Roadwork achieved gold status.

In late 1972, Winter brought together Dan Hartman, Ronnie Montrose and Chuck Ruff to form The Edgar Winter Group, who created such hits as the number one "Frankenstein" and "Free Ride" (with lead vocals by its writer Hartman). Released in November 1972, They Only Come Out at Night, peaked at the number 3 position on the Billboard Hot 200 and stayed on the charts for 80 weeks. It was certified gold in April 1973 by the RIAA, and double platinum in November 1986.

Winter invented the keyboard body strap early in his career, an innovation that allows him the freedom to move around on stage during his multi-instrument high-energy performances.

After They Only Come Out at Night, Winter released Shock Treatment, featuring guitarist Rick Derringer in place of Ronnie Montrose. That album contained Winter's third and final Top 40 single "River's Risin, again sung by Hartman. Later albums included Jasmine Nightdreams, The Edgar Winter Group with Rick Derringer, Together: Edgar Winter and Johnny Winter Live, Recycled, a reunion with White Trash, Standing on Rock, Mission Earth, Live in Japan, Not a Kid Anymore, The Real Deal, Winter Blues and Rebel Road.

Winter also kept busy doing session work, playing saxophone on 'Meat Loaf's "All Reved Up and Nowhere to Go", Dan Hartman's solo hit "Instant Replay", Tina Turner's "Simply the Best" and David Lee Roth's remake of "Just a Gigolo", as well as appearing on material by Rick Derringer, Johnny Winter, Ronnie Montrose, Todd Rundgren, Michael McDonald and many others.

Major national television and radio campaigns have used Winter's music to advertise their products. Winter has also made frequent television appearances, both to promote his music and to give his opinions, on shows such as Politically Incorrect. Winter also starred with George Hamilton in a commercial for Miller Lite beer. He appeared in the film Netherworld and the TV shows The Cape, Mysterious Ways, Late Show with David Letterman, and Jimmy Kimmel Live!.

Winter's music has been used in many film and television projects, including Netherworld, Air America, Dazed and Confused, My Cousin Vinny, Encino Man, Son in Law, What's Love Got to Do with It, Wayne's World 2, Starkid, Wag the Dog, Knockabout Guys, Duets, Radio, The Simpsons, Queer as Folk, and Tupac: Resurrection. Tupac: Resurrection, a biography of rapper Tupac Shakur, produced and co-written by Eminem, sampled Winter's song "Dying to Live" as "Runnin' (Dying to Live)," incorporting vocals by the Notorious B.I.G., Tupac, and Winter himself. "Runnin peaked at number 5 on the Hot R&B/Hip Hop Singles Sales chart and the soundtrack was #1 for 8 consecutive weeks. Blues performer Jonny Lang also covered "Dying to Live" around this time. Winter performed the song solo at the piano on Jimmy Kimmel Live!

Winter's 2003 CD and DVD titled Live at the Galaxy was recorded live at the Galaxy Theatre for Classic Pictures. It features the songs, "Keep Playing That Rock and Roll", "Turn on Your Love Light", "Free Ride", "Texas", "Show Your Love", "New Orleans", "Frankenstein" and "Tobacco Road". In addition, the DVD includes a 30-minute documentary, Edgar Winter: The Man and His Music.

Winter also played with Ringo Starr in the ninth (2006), tenth (2008), eleventh (2010-2011) and fifteenth (2022-)  iterations of his All-Starr Band. The band's 2010–11 tour featured the reunion of Winter and Rick Derringer. From August to early-September 2017, The Edgar Winter Band toured as the opening act for both Deep Purple and Alice Cooper as they performed several North American tour dates as part of The Long Goodbye Tour.

In 2017, Cherry Red released a four-CD remastered compilation of all of the Edgar Winter solo albums from 1970 until 1980, entitled Tell Me in a Whisper: The Solo Albums 1970 - 1980. In 2018, Cherry Red also released a remastered six-CD compilation of the Edgar Winter: White Trash Band and the Edgar Winter Band albums entitled I've Got News for You: Featuring the Edgar Winter Group & Edgar Winter's White Trash 1971 - 1977.

Mission Earth
Winter also produced, arranged, and performed on the 1986 album Mission Earth. This album's lyrics and music were written by Scientology founder L. Ron Hubbard. Hubbard is said to have left detailed instructions and audio tapes for the musicians and producers to follow when making the album. Winter described Mission Earth as "both a return to rock's primal roots and yet highly experimental."  Winter wrote, "Ron's technical insight of the recording process was outstanding." Winter also described Hubbard's delineation of counter-rhythm in rock as something "which was nothing short of phenomenal, particularly in as much as it had then been entirely unexplored and only later heard in the African-based rhythms of Paul Simon's work, some five years after Ron's analysis."

Personal life
Winter and his wife, Monique, live in Beverly Hills, California. The couple have no children. Winter stated in an interview: "I can see how that would be a wonderful rewarding thing, but I think there are enough people in the world" and that "it might have been more problematical if I had children with a career and all of it. I tour all the time. If I were to have children, I would want to be home all the time."

Discography

Solo albums

Edgar Winter's White Trash albums

Edgar Winter Group albums

Edgar Winter Compilation albums

Albums with other artists

Singles

Producer
Open Fire – (1978) (Ronnie Montrose) producer, piano, harpsichord
Crazy from the Heat – (1985) (David Lee Roth)

References

External links

 
 
 
 Edgar Winter Interview NAMM Oral History Library (2013)

1946 births
Living people
People with albinism
American rock musicians
People from Beaumont, Texas
American Scientologists
Epic Records artists
American rock saxophonists
American male saxophonists
American blues singers
American blues guitarists
American male guitarists
American blues pianists
American male pianists
Blue Sky Records artists
Keytarists
Guitarists from Texas
20th-century American guitarists
20th-century American pianists
21st-century saxophonists
Ringo Starr & His All-Starr Band members